The 2012 Asia Kabaddi Cup was the second edition of the circle style Asia Kabaddi Cup. It was played in Lahore, Punjab, Pakistan from 1 to 5 November 2012 with teams from 6 Asian countries. It was won by Pakistan who won the competition by technical rule as India decided to walk out of the match. India forfeited the match with 6 minutes remaining in the final game claiming that the officials were unfair to them. Things worsened further when Indian coach Goormel Singh was shown a green card by the referee for his 'constant interference in field matters'. He was said to have crossed the line literally, entering the field of play when he shouldn't have. This gave rise to heated arguments between the two teams and the scene ended with India walking out in protest.

Teams

Broadcasting
Geo Super

Opening ceremony
The opening ceremony was held at Punjab Stadium in Lahore, Punjab, Pakistan on November 1, 2012, and aired live on Geo Super.

Prize money
The organizers allocated a cash prize of Rs. 1.5 million (US$15,790) for the winners while the runners-up and third positioned teams were awarded cash prizes of US$10,526 and US$5,263, respectively.

Schedule
All matches' timings were according to Indian Standard Time (UTC +5:30).

Round Robin

 

 [4 November 2012]
Pakistan 46 Vs. Sri. Lanka 26 /
India 53 Vs. Iran 35 /
Afghanistan 53 Vs. Nepal 32 

 [5 November 2012]
Iran 72 Vs. Nepal 27 /
Sri Lanka 51 Vs. Afghanistan 42 /
India 31 Vs Pakistan 40

 [Final Ranking]
1- Pakistan 2- India 3- Iran and Sri Lanka 5- Afghanistan 6- Nepal

References
http://www.livekabaddi.com/2012/11/

Kabaddi competitions in Pakistan